The Kansas City Water Department Building in Kansas City, Missouri is a building from 1904. It was listed on the National Register of Historic Places in 1994.

References

Commercial buildings completed in 1904
Buildings and structures in Kansas City, Missouri
Commercial buildings on the National Register of Historic Places in Missouri
National Register of Historic Places in Kansas City, Missouri